Zamia dressleri is a species of plant in the family Zamiaceae. It is endemic to Panama, where it grows in rainforest habitat. It is found in Colón and Comarca de San Blas provinces.

References

dressleri
Endangered plants
Endemic flora of Panama
Taxonomy articles created by Polbot